George Papazov (Papasoff, Georges)  (2 February 1894, in Yambol – 23 April 1972, in Vence, Alpes-Maritimes) was a Bulgarian painter and writer. He became prominent in Paris, worked and died in France. He was among the first surrealists, and was an acquaintance of Joan Miró, Max Ernst and Pablo Picasso.

Writings
 Paris – l'oeuvre et le destin des grands peintres (Paris, 1936)
 Derain, mon copain (Paris, 1960)
 Lettres a Derain (Paris, 1966)

Bibliography
 Crespelle, Jean Paul, Montparnasse vivant, Paris, 1962
 Krystev, Kiril, George Papazov, Sofia, 1973
 Nakoff, A., Georges Pappasoff, Franc-tireur du Surrealisme, Brussels, 1973
 Станчева, Румяна Л. Художникът Жорж Папазов като писател. Вербализация на сюрреалното. [Roumiana L. Stantcheva. The painter Georges Papazoff as a writer. Verbalization of surreal]. София: Колибри, 2014. http://www.colibri.bg/eng/books/1086/rumyana-l-stancheva-the-artist-georges-papazoff-as-a-writer

Honours
Papazov Island in Antarctica is named after George Papazov.

Notes

1894 births
1972 deaths
Bulgarian writers
People from Yambol
Bulgarian emigrants to France
20th-century Bulgarian painters
20th-century male artists
Male painters